Geheimrat was the title of the highest advising officials at the Imperial, royal or princely courts of the Holy Roman Empire, who jointly formed the Geheimer Rat reporting to the ruler. The term remained in use during subsequent monarchic reigns in German-speaking areas of Europe until the end of the First World War. At its origin the literal meaning of the word in German was 'trusted advisor' - the word "geheim" (secret) implying  that such an advisor could be trusted with the Monarch's secrets (similar to "secretary" in English being linguistically related to "secret").  The English-language equivalent is Privy Councillor.

The office contributing to the state's politics and legislation had its roots in the age of absolutism from the 17th century onward, when a governmental administration by a dependent bureaucracy was established similar to the French Conseil du Roi. A precursor was the Reichshofrat, a judicial body established by Emperor Maximilian I of Habsburg. In Austria the professional title of Hofrat (Court Councillor) has remained in use as an official title for deserved civil servants up to today.

With the Empire's dissolution and the rise of Constitutionalism in the aftermath of the French Revolution, the office of a Geheimrat became an honorific title conferred by the German states upon high officials, accompanied by the address Exzellenz. The term is also used in combination with the word Ecke – , colloquially describing male pattern baldness at the 'edges' of the forehead (i.e. the upper 'corners' of the face).

In the Republic of Austria the title was officially abolished in 1919. In Germany, the title largely disappeared after the fall of the German Empire in 1918, when the various princely states of Germany were replaced by the constituent states of the Weimar Republic, although Geheimräte continued to be appointed by the Free State of Bavaria. However, many honorees continued to use it, and the title Geheimrat, its abbreviation  and related abbreviations (and even ) appear in captions until the 1930s, such as used by the German Federal Archives.

Notable Geheimräte 

 Nicholas Remy (1530–1616), title bestowed in 1575 by Duke Charles III of Lorraine
 Raimondo Montecuccoli (1609–1680), in 1660 by Emperor Leopold I
 Gottfried Leibniz (1646–1716), in 1678 by Duke John Frederick of Brunswick-Calenberg
 Andrey Osterman (1686–1747), in 1721 by Emperor Peter I of Russia
 Emerich de Vattel (1714–1767), in 1758 by Elector Frederick Augustus II of Saxony
 Mathias Franz Graf von Chorinsky Freiherr von Ledske (1720–1786), in 1778 by Empress regnant Maria Theresa of the Holy Roman Empire
 Johann Wolfgang von Goethe (1749–1832), in 1779 by Duke Charles Augustus of Saxe-Weimar
 Samuel Thomas von Sömmerring (1755–1830), in 1810 by King Maximilian I Joseph of Bavaria
 Carl Friedrich Gauss (1777–1855),
 Joseph Freiherr von Eichendorff (1788–1857), in 1841 by King Frederick William IV of Prussia
 Friedrich Georg Wilhelm von Struve (1793–1864), in 1856 by Emperor Alexander II of Russia
 Johann Gustav Stickel (1805-1896), Charles Frederick, Grand Duke of Saxe-Weimar-Eisenach
 Hermann von Helmholtz (1821–1894)
 Heinrich von Stephan (1831–1897), in 1868 by King Wilhelm I of Prussia
 Felix Draeseke (1835–1913), in 1906 by King Frederick Augustus III of Saxony
 Richard Assmann (1845–1918), by German emperor King Wilhelm II of Prussia
 Felix Klein (1849–1925)
 Ignaz Bing (1840–1918), industrialist and naturalist, Geh. Kommerzienrat
 Adolf von Harnack (1851–1930), by German emperor King Wilhelm II of Prussia
 Friedrich Loeffler (1852–1915), by German emperor King Wilhelm II of Prussia
 Georg von Schanz (1853–1931), in 1914 by King Ludwig III of Bavaria
 Emil Adolf von Behring (1854–1917), in 1903 by German emperor King Wilhelm II of Prussia
 Paul Ehrlich (1854–1915), in 1911 by German emperor King Wilhelm II of Prussia
 Ferdinand Tönnies (1855–1936), in 1917 by German emperor King Wilhelm II of Prussia
 Theodor Curtius (1857–1928), in 1895 by German emperor King Wilhelm II of Prussia
 Max Planck (1858–1947), by German emperor King Wilhelm II of Prussia
 Alfred Hugenberg (1865–1951), by German emperor King Wilhelm II of Prussia
 Leo Maximilian Baginski (1891–1964), in 1919 by Prince Albert of Thurn and Taxis
 August Bier (18611949), by German emperor King Wilhelm II of Prussia
 Ferdinand Sauerbruch (1875–1951)
Gottfried von Schmitt (1827-1908), title given in 1888 by Prince Regent Luitpold of Bavaria
Josef von Schmitt (1838-1907), title given in 1896 by Prince Regent Luitpold of Bavaria

See also
Privy Councillor
Active Privy Councillor
Active Privy Councillor, 1st class

References

 
Legal history of Germany
Government of the Holy Roman Empire

ko:추밀원